The Battle of Novo Litovoskaya took place on 7 August 1919, and was the result of two small contingents of opposing troops making contact during their respective patrols of the town. After initial stubborn resistance, the entire Russian patrol was killed or captured while the American patrol of similar strength remained completely intact.

Battle
After repelling a numerically-superior Russian surprise attack at Romanovka and clearing the Suchan Mines during the Suchan Valley Campaign, a 40-man patrol of Company H (31st Infantry) under the command of Captain Owen Rhoads decimated an enemy patrol of 30 Red Army troops. The Americans sustained no casualties, and Corporal Frankenfeld received recognition for bravery after overrunning a Russian-held hut single-handedly with an M1911 pistol as a consequence of getting caught out in the open during the firefight.

References

1919 in Russia
Battles of the Russian Civil War involving the United States
20th-century military history of the United States
Battles of the Russian Civil War
August 1919 events
Conflicts in 1919